This list contains the lakes, tarns and reservoirs in the Lake District National Park in Cumbria, England.

Only one body of water, Bassenthwaite Lake, is traditionally named a lake. Larger bodies of water in the Lake District are generally named as mere or water, whilst smaller ones are denoted by tarn. Some writers, particularly in the media, refer to Lake Windermere though this use is deprecated.

Physical characteristics of the main lakes

This table gives details of those bodies of water with a surface area of at least 0.1 km².

Map of major lakes
The map shows the locations of the lakes with a volume over 4 x 106 m³ and gives an indication of the volume of water in each lake. The markers suggest this by showing the size of a drop of water where the volume of the drop would be in proportion to the quantity of water in the lake (the diameter of the drop is proportional to the cube root of the lake's volume).

Lakes, tarns and reservoirs 
Alcock Tarn, east of Grasmere, below Heron Pike
Angle Tarn, north of Bowfell
Angle Tarn, east of Patterdale, by Angletarn Pikes
Bassenthwaite Lake
Beacon Tarn in the Blawith fells, west of Coniston Water
Bigland Tarn near Haverthwaite
Blackbeck Tarn on Haystacks
Bleaberry Tarn, north of Red Pike, near Buttermere
Blea Tarn, near Boot, Eskdale
Blea Tarn, between Pike of Blisco and Lingmoor Fell
Blea Tarn, on Watendlath fell, north of Ullscarf
Blea Water, below High Street
Blelham Tarn, west of Windermere
Blind Tarn, on the east side of the ridge south of Dow Crag
Boretree Tarn, west of the southern end of Windermere
Bowscale Tarn, on the slopes of Bowscale Fell
Brothers Water
Burnmoor Tarn, Between Eskdale and Wasdale
Buttermere
Chapelhouse Reservoir, south-east of Uldale
Codale Tarn, east of High Raise and the Langdale Pikes
Cogra Moss, between Ennerdale Water and Loweswater
Coniston Water
Crummock Water
Dalehead Tarn, between Dale Head and High Spy
Derwent Water
Devoke Water
Dock Tarn, east of Rosthwaite, south of Watendlath
Easedale Tarn, west of Grasmere
Elter Water
Ennerdale Water
Esthwaite Water
Floutern Tarn, north of Great Borne
Foxes Tarn, north of Scafell
Goat's Water, west of the Old Man of Coniston
Grasmere
Greendale Tarn, by Middle Fell near Wasdale
Green Hows tarn Graythwaite
Upper Green How’s tarn Graythwaite
Grisedale Tarn, between Fairfield and Dollywaggon Pike
Gurnal Dubs, west of Garnett Bridge
Harrop Tarn, in the Wythburn fells, west of Thirlmere
Haweswater Reservoir
Hayeswater
Heights Tarn
Helton Tarn, northwest of Witherslack
High Dam Tarn, west of the southern end of Windermere
High House Tarn, south of Glaramara
Innominate Tarn, on Haystacks
Kelly Hall Tarn, south-east of Torver
Kentmere Reservoir
Knipe Tarn, south-east of Bowness-on-Windermere
Lanty's Tarn, west of Patterdale
Launchy Tarn, on Dale Head
Levers Water, on the east side of the Coniston fells
Lily Tarn, north of Clappersgate
Lingmoor Tarn, on Lingmoor Fell
Little Langdale Tarn
Little Tarn, near Orthwaite, south of Uldale
Littlewater Tarn, near Bampton
Long Moss, between Torver and Coniston Water
Loughrigg Tarn, below Loughrigg
Loweswater
Low Tarn, south of Red Pike, between Yewbarrow and the Seatallan-Haycock ridge
Low Water, north of the Old Man of Coniston
Meadley Reservoir, by Flat Fell, Ennerdale
Mortimere, south of Clappersgate
Moss Eccles Tarn, between Windermere and Esthwaite Water
Over Water, south of Uldale
Parkgate Tarn, near Eskdale
Potter Tarn, west of Garnett Bridge
Red Tarn (Helvellyn), below the summit of Helvellyn
Red Tarn (Langdale), between Cold Pike and Pike of Blisco
Rydal Water
Scales Tarn, below the summit of Blencathra and Sharp Edge
Schoolknott Tarn, south east of the town of Windermere
Scoat Tarn, below Red Pike and Scoat Fell
Seathwaite Tarn, west of the Coniston fells
Simpson Ground Reservoir, east of Staveley-in-Cartmel
Siney Tarn, north of Eskdale
Skeggles Water, between Kentmere and Longsleddale
Slew Tarn, east of Skelwith Bridge
Small Water, between Mardale Ill Bell and Harter Fell
Sow How Tarn
Sprinkling Tarn, between Scafell Pike and Seathwaite Fell
Stickle Tarn, Langdale, below Pavey Ark in the Langdale Pikes
Styhead Tarn, at the head of Styhead Gill, at Sty Head Pass, between Scafell Pike and Great Gable
Tarn at Leaves on Rosthwaite Fell
Tarn Hows
Tewet Tarn, below Low Rigg near St John's in the Vale
Thirlmere
Three Dubs Tarn, between Windermere and Esthwaite Water
Three Tarns, between Bowfell and Crinkle Crags
Torver Tarn, disused reservoir on Torver Low Common
Tosh Tarn, south east of Wast Water, near the River Irt
Ullswater
Wast Water
Watendlath Tarn
Wet Sleddale Reservoir
Windermere
Wise Een Tarn, between Windermere and Esthwaite Water
Woodhow Tarn, south east of Wast Water, near the River Irt
Yew Tree Tarn, between Holme Fell and Tarn Hows

Former lakes, tarns and reservoirs 

 Baystone Bank Reservoir, east of Black Combe (disused and then removed in 2011) 
 Keppel Cove Tarn, north of Catstycam, dam destroyed by flood, 1931

References

Lake District

Lakes in the Lake District